The Vessey School, on County Road 859 in Harding County, South Dakota, near Haley, North Dakota, was built around 1920.  It was listed on the National Register of Historic Places in 1987.

The listing included a second contributing building, a small house which was moved to the site to serve as a teacherage.

References

Schools in South Dakota
National Register of Historic Places in Harding County, South Dakota
School buildings completed in 1920
Teacherages